Actia pamirica is an eastern Palearctic species of fly in the family Tachinidae.

Distribution
Tajikistan.

References

pamirica
Diptera of Asia
Insects described in 1974